Alison Hersey Risch (born October 23, 1936), formerly Alison Hersey, is a former American field hockey, lacrosse player and official.

She was a three sport athlete (Field Hockey, Basketball and Softball) at Winchester High School in Winchester, Massachusetts. Alison attended Mount Holyoke College from 1955 to 1959. She played with the US Field Hockey Touring team from 1956 to 1969. Alison also played on the U.S. Women's National Lacrosse Team from 1961 to 1970 and as team captain from 1964 to 1970. After graduating from Mount Holyoke, Alison earned a master's degree from Tufts University. She later served as a field hockey coach at Kennett High School in Conway, New Hampshire. She also served as a match coordinator and internationally rated umpire for more than 40 years.

Alison also was a competitive alpine ski racer. In 1964 she was certified by the Professional Ski Instructor’s Association and she has been a ski instructor and director since 1963.

In January 1988, she became one of the charter inductees into the USA Field Hockey Hall of Fame. In 1999 Alison was inducted into the New England Chapter of the National Lacrosse Hall of Fame and in 2003 she was inducted into the National Lacrosse Hall of Fame, the Mount Holyoke Athletics Hall of Fame  (inaugural class)  and the Winchester High School Hall of Fame (1995).

References

American female field hockey players
1936 births
Mount Holyoke College alumni
Living people
21st-century American women